Headline Crasher is a 1936 American drama film directed by Leslie Goodwins from a screenplay by Sherman L. Lowe and Charles R. Condon.  The film stars Frankie Darro, Kane Richmond, and Muriel Evans.

Cast
 Frankie Darro as Jimmy Tallant
 Kane Richmond as Larry Deering
 Muriel Evans as Edith Arlen
 Richard Tucker as Senator Tallant
 John Merton as Tony Scarlotti
 Eleanor Stewart as Helen
 Edward Earle as Atwood
 Harry Harvey, Sr. as Harry Harvey
 John Ward as Campaign manager
 Jack Ingram as Al

References

Films directed by Leslie Goodwins
1936 drama films
American black-and-white films